The Hunter 28 is an American sailboat that was designed as a racer-cruiser and first built in 1989.

The Hunter 28 is a development of the 1985 Hunter 28.5.

Production
The design was built by Hunter Marine in the United States between 1989 and 1994, but it is now out of production.

Design
The Hunter 28 is a recreational keelboat, built predominantly of fiberglass. It has a fractional sloop rig, a raked stem, a reverse transom, an internally-mounted spade-type rudder controlled by a wheel and a fixed wing keel. It displaces  and carries  of ballast.

The boat is fitted with a Japanese Yanmar diesel engine of  Universal Atomic 4.

Operational history
Marine surveyor David Pascoe wrote a scathing review of the design in 1998, criticizing the aft cabin, the head design, dinette, the reverse transom and swim platform, rigging dimensions, deck hatch, cockpit dimensions with regard to the wheel size and placement, winch mounting, lack of cockpit back support, the keel design, fiberglass quality and the engine mounts. In concluding he writes, "This could have been a nice, well-made boat. Parts of it are, but the builder didn't have his priorities straight. If all you're going to do is sail around the pond on balmy days, its probably fine for that. A serious deep water sailor she's not.  This is a price boat, and there's altogether too much that you don't get for what you don't pay, for any serious sailor to take the Hunter 28 seriously. There's a good reason why first impressions should be taken seriously, too. What you don't pay for up front will surely be heavily loaded on the back end. Count on it ... If  you wonder why people are leaving sailing like the plague just arrived, possibly this boat offers some reasons. There are too many just like it."

See also
List of sailing boat types

Related development
Hunter 28.5
Hunter 280

Similar sailboats
Alerion Express 28
Aloha 28
Beneteau First 285
Cal 28
Catalina 28
Cumulus 28
Grampian 28
J/28
O'Day 28
Pearson 28
Sabre 28
Sea Sprite 27
Sirius 28
Tanzer 28
TES 28 Magnam
Viking 28

References

Keelboats
1980s sailboat type designs
Sailing yachts
Sailboat types built by Hunter Marine